Frank Elliott Barnett (July 20, 1933 – July 15, 2016) was the governor of American Samoa from October 1, 1976, to May 27, 1977. Before becoming governor, he was a Federal Bureau of Investigation agent and a Tennessee attorney. He served as the first lieutenant governor of American Samoa for two years prior to his governorship. While Governor, a number of Samoans signed a petition accusing him of abusing local officials; others signed a counter-petition supporting him, and the charges were eventually dropped. This arose from his firing of Mere Betham, a native who had been serving as Samoan Director of Education, an action he defended as necessary to improve education on the island, but others decried as racist; Barnett reinstated Betham one week after dismissing her.

Barnett graduated from Knoxville High School in Knoxville, Tennessee in 1950. He served in the United States Marine Corps. Barnett went to University of Tennessee and later received his law degree in 1959 from University of Tennessee College of Law. He practiced law in Knoxville, Tennessee and was involved with the Republican Party.

Barnett's wife was Carolyn Barnett. They had two children.

References

1933 births
2016 deaths
Republican Party governors of American Samoa
Federal Bureau of Investigation agents
Lieutenant Governors of American Samoa
Tennessee lawyers
Military personnel from Georgia (U.S. state)
Military personnel from Tennessee
Politicians from Atlanta
Politicians from Knoxville, Tennessee
University of Tennessee College of Law alumni
Tennessee Republicans
20th-century American lawyers